Fernbrae Meadows is a public greenspace in South Lanarkshire, located on high ground to the south of Rutherglen, specifically directly south of the Fernhill neighbourhood. It is a proposed local nature reserve.

History

The park was created between 2015 and 2019, following the closure of Blairbeth Golf Course, which had operated there since 1956. It was named Fernbrae Meadows following consultation with the local community. The park lies adjacent to Cathkin Braes Country Park.

In 1854, journalist Hugh MacDonald published Rambles Round Glasgow in which he describes a visit to the area thus:
From Stonelaw to Cathkin the road gradually ascends through a delightful succession of gently swelling knolls and fields in a high state of cultivation, interspersed with clumps of wood and fine belts of planting, the haunts of numerous birds, and at this season of love ringing merrily with their sweetest melodies.  

Archaeologists and antiquarians have drawn attention to the existence of prehistoric burial mounds and cairns in the surrounding area.

Biodiversity 
The recent development of Fernbrae Meadows has created a number of habitats, including wildflower meadow, woodland, wetlands and marshy grassland.

The grasslands contain holcus lanatus, rough meadow-grass, meadow foxtail, bush vetch, common hogweed, sweet vernal-grass, meadow vetchling, broad-leaved dock, field forget me not, common sorrel and bracken.

Wet areas contain meadowsweet, soft-rush, marsh Thistle, sharp-flowered Rush, common yellow sedge, oval sedge, marsh-bedstraw and marsh marigold.

References

External links
 Friends of Fernbrae Meadows on Facebook

Categories

Parks in South Lanarkshire
Urban public parks
Country parks in Scotland
Rutherglen
Urban public parks in the United Kingdom
Defunct golf clubs and courses